KXLK-CD, virtual channel 40 (UHF digital channel 14), is a low-power, Class A Ion Mystery–affiliated television station licensed to Austin, Texas, United States. Owned by the Univision Local Media subsidiary of TelevisaUnivision USA, it is a sister station to Killeen-licensed Univision owned-and-operated station KAKW-DT (channel 62). KXLK-CD's transmitter is located at the West Austin Antenna Farm north of West Lake Hills.

History
The station was affiliated with the religious African-American The Word Network. Until September 2014, KXLK-CA was the Home Shopping Network affiliate for the Austin area.

Due to the 2016–2017 FCC TV spectrum auction, KXLK-CD moved from RF channel 23 to RF channel 14 on June 21, 2019. On October 17, 2017, Univision announced its intent to purchase KXLK-CD from Radio Spectrum Partners for $2.55 million.

ATSC 3.0 lighthouse 
KXLK-CD transitioned to ATSC 3.0 lighthouse station on May 19, 2021 and carries ATSC 3.0 simulcasts of KTBC, KAKW, and KTFO.

The following ATSC 3.0 subchannels broadcast on RF channel 14:

References

External links 

True Crime Network affiliates
XLK-CD
Television channels and stations established in 1997
Low-power television stations in the United States
ATSC 3.0 television stations